Elliott Knob is one of the highest mountains in the northern portions of the U.S. state of Virginia. At , the peak is located on the ridge known as Great North Mountain. A small, naturally growing stand of red spruce trees is on the summit, and the upper slopes also have yellow birch and sugar maple, indicating that the altitude is just high enough to support tree species normally found hundreds of miles to the north. Otherwise oak and hickory trees are the most common types found on the mountain. The mountain is entirely within George Washington and Jefferson National Forests.

The area around the mountain is inhabited by a wide array of fauna including black bears, white-tailed deer and the elusive bobcat. 

A primitive jeep trail ascends the mountain from the east but it is also closed to public vehicles.

Right beside the base of the fire tower there is a National Geodetic Survey triangulation station disk. The entire firetower structure is enclosed within a fence with barbed wire at the top. However, there is evidence of people gaining entry in the form of holes under the fence and loose sections where the fence can be pulled up high enough for a person to crawl under, since the ground is only covered with grass in that area of the summit.

Recreation
The route for the Grindstone 100 Miler ultramarathon includes the summit of Elliot Knob.

Gallery

References

Mountains of Virginia
Mountains of Augusta County, Virginia